Toyosaka can refer to:

 Toyosaka, Hiroshima
 Toyosaka, Niigata
 Toyosaka Station